Globalno was a Bosnian television talk show airing on Wednesdays on BN Televizija in Bosnia and Herzegovina. The show premiered on Friday, December 18, 2015, and was created by Boris Malagurski. It was hosted by Boris Malagurski (2015–2017) and Marko Jeremić (2017). The TV show dealt with global political, economic and social issues from a domestic perspective. The first season was aired on Fridays. The show's final airing was June 14, 2017.

Format 
The TV show begun with a monologue by the host, Malagurski, who talks about events from the previous week, with video clips and photographs. The monologue is inspired by Last Week Tonight with John Oliver. Malagurski gives his comments in front of a studio audience and then introduces the guests, with whom he talks for the rest of the show. The program sometimes includes reports from Bijeljina and cities in the region, but also countries around the world, such as Australia and South Africa.

Guests 
Politicians from Croatia, Bosnia and Herzegovina and Serbia who have made appearances on the show include former or current ministers of the Serbian Government such as Velimir Ilić, Žarko Obradović, Dragan Šutanovac and Bratislav Petković, Human Shield members Ivan Pernar and Ivan Vilibor Sinčić, and member of the Presidency of Bosnia and Herzegovina Mladen Ivanić.

Guest appearances

Episodes

Season One (2015–2016)

Season Two (2016–2017)

International broadcast 
Globalno is seen internationally on YouTube and is broadcast on BN TV Satellite Channel on Wednesdays.

See also
Revolucija (TV show)

References

2010s Bosnia and Herzegovina television series
Serbian-language television shows